Japanese primrose may refer to two species of plant within the family Primulaceae:

Primula japonica, native to Japan
Primula sieboldii, endemic to East Asia